Moumoustra was a town of ancient Cilicia, inhabited during Byzantine times. 

Its site is located near Mecidiye in Asiatic Turkey.

References

Populated places in ancient Cilicia
Former populated places in Turkey
Populated places of the Byzantine Empire
History of Osmaniye Province